Thomas William Sadler (April 17, 1831 – October 29, 1896) was a U.S. Representative from Alabama.

Born near Russellville, Alabama, Sadler moved with his parents to Jefferson County, Alabama, in 1833.
He pursued an academic course.
He moved to Autauga County, Alabama, in 1855 and engaged in mercantile pursuits.
During the Civil War volunteered and served in the division of the Confederate States Army  commanded by Gen. Joseph Wheeler.
He engaged in agricultural pursuits.
He studied law.
He was admitted to the bar in 1867 and commenced practice in Prattville, Alabama.
County superintendent of education 1875-1884.

Sadler was elected as a Democrat to the Forty-ninth Congress (March 4, 1885 – March 3, 1887).
He was an unsuccessful candidate for renomination in 1886.
He resumed the practice of law.
He died in Prattville, Alabama, October 29, 1896.
He was interred in Oak Hill Cemetery.

References

External links

1831 births
1896 deaths
People from Franklin County, Alabama
Confederate States Army personnel
Democratic Party members of the United States House of Representatives from Alabama
People from Prattville, Alabama
19th-century American politicians